The Best of Willie Nelson may refer to:

 The Best of Willie Nelson (1973 album)
 The Best of Willie Nelson (1982 album)